A Thematic Guide to Optimality Theory is a 2001 book by  John McCarthy in which the author provides a theoretical introduction to optimality theory.

Reception
The book was reviewed by David Odden, Chiara Frigeni, Marina Tzakosta and Diana Archangeli.

References

External links 
 A Thematic Guide to Optimality Theory

2001 non-fiction books
Phonology books
Linguistics textbooks
Optimality Theory
Books on linguistic typology
Cambridge University Press books